Bonnie Brae is a census-designated place (CDP) in Will County, Illinois, United States. It is in the northern part of the county and is bordered to the north, east, and south by the city of Lockport.

Bonnie Brae was first listed as a CDP prior to the 2020 census.

Demographics

References 

Census-designated places in Will County, Illinois
Census-designated places in Illinois